Stănescu may refer to:

Cristian Stănescu (born 1951), Romanian politician and Member of the European Parliament
Mircea Stănescu (1969–2009), Romanian Member of Parliament (2004–2008) and deputy
Nichita Stănescu (1933–1983), Romanian poet and essayist
Raphael Stănescu (born 1993), Romanian footballer
Robert Stănescu (born 1985), Romanian artistic gymnast who specialized in still rings
Saviana Stănescu, award-winning Romanian-American poet, playwright and journalist
Valentin Stănescu (1922–1994), previously manager of the football team Rapid București

See also
Stadionul Giuleşti-Valentin Stănescu, football stadium in Bucharest, Romania and is the home stadium of Rapid București

See also 
 Stan (surname)

Romanian-language surnames